Christin Hussong (born 17 March 1994) is a German track and field athlete who competes in the javelin throw. She has won gold at the 2011 World Youth Championships, 2015 European U23 Championships and at the 2018 European Championships. Hussong holds the European Championships record with her personal best throw of 69.19 m.

She is a member of LAZ Zweibrücken's track and field squad and is coached by her father, Udo Hussong.

Career

2010–2015
Hussong represented Germany in the girls' javelin throw at the 2010 Summer Youth Olympics, placing fourth with a throw of 49.89 m. Her season best that year, 55.35 m, ranked her third in the world among youth athletes.

Hussong improved her personal best to 59.74 m at the 2011 World Youth Championships, winning gold by more than five metres and setting a new championship record; the International Association of Athletics Federations named her Rising Star of the Year in women's athletics. 59.74 m remained Hussong's personal best until 2014; at the 2012 World Junior Championships she threw 53.20 m in her best effort and placed seventh, while at the 2013 European Junior Championships she threw 57.90 m and won silver, one centimetre behind gold medalist Sofi Flink of Sweden.

In 2014, Hussong broke 60 metres for the first time, winning with a throw of 60.26 m at the German U23 Championships on 15 June. A month later, she threw 63.34 m at the Spitzen Leichtathletik Luzern meeting, setting a German U23 record and meeting the qualifying standard for the European Championships. At the 2014 European Championships she threw 61.13 m in the qualification round and 59.29 m in the final, placing seventh.

In March 2015, she won gold with a throw of 60.81 m at the 2015 European U23 Throwing Cup. In July, she won gold at the 2015 European U23 Championships with a  65.60 m throw, seven metres ahead of second place. This 65.60 m throw broke both her own German U23 record and Madara Palameika's championship record and moved Hussong to second (behind Mariya Abakumova) on the European U23 all-time list. She then competed at the 2015 World Championships in August. She placed first in the qualification round with a personal best throw of 65.92 m and finished sixth in the final with a 62.98 m effort.

2016–present
In March 2016, she competed at the 2016 European Throwing Cup, where she won gold with a 61.80 m throw. In June, she set a new personal best of 66.41 m at the 2016 German Athletics Championships, winning the competition in the process. The next month, she competed at the 2016 European Championships, where she placed seventeenth with a 57.17 m throw in the qualification round and did not make it to the final. In August, Hussong represented her homeland at the 2016 Summer Olympics. She advanced through the qualification round with a throw of 62.17 m and placed twelfth in the final with a 57.70 m throw.

In March 2017, she competed at the 2017 European Throwing Cup, where she won bronze with a 59.00 m throw. In July, she placed first at the 2017 Spitzen Leichtathletik Luzern with a seasonal best throw of 64.18 m. In August, she participated in the 2017 World Championships. She placed seventeenth in the qualification round with a throw of 60.86 m and did not make it through to the final. Later that month, she competed at the 2017 Summer Universiade. She topped the qualification round with a 60.18 m throw then finished fifth in the final with a 60.59 m effort.

In July 2018, Hussong won gold at the German Athletics Championships for a second time, with a throw of 63.54 m. In August, she won gold at the 2018 European Athletics Championships. She won the qualifying round with a personal best throw of 67.29 m, and in the final set another personal best—and championship record—throw of 67.90 m, over six metres further than silver medallist Nikola Ogrodníková. She won silver at the 2018 IAAF Continental Cup in September.

Hussong opened her 2019 season by winning a silver medal at the 2019 European Throwing Cup in March with a throw of 65.47 m, thus surpassing the World Championships qualifying standard of 61.50 m. At the 2019 World Athletics Championships from 30 September to 1 October, Hussong placed fourth in the final, throwing 65.21 m.

Competition record
{| 
|-
!colspan="5"|Representing 
|-
|2011
|World Youth Championships
|Lille, France
|bgcolor=gold|1st
|59.74 m
|-
|2012
|World Junior Championships
|Barcelona, Spain
|7th
|53.20 m
|-
|2013
|European Junior Championships
|Rieti, Italy
|bgcolor=silver|2nd
|57.90 m
|-
|2014
|European Championships
|Zürich, Switzerland
|7th
|59.29 m
|-
|rowspan=3|2015
|European U23 Throwing Cup
|Leiria, Portugal
|bgcolor=gold|1st
|60.91 m
|-
|European U23 Championships
|Tallinn, Estonia
|bgcolor=gold|1st
|65.60 m
|-
|World Championships
|Beijing, China
|6th
|62.98 m
|-
|rowspan=3|2016
|European Throwing Cup
|Arad, Romania
|bgcolor=gold|1st
|61.80 m
|-
|European Championships
|Amsterdam, Netherlands
|17th (q)
|57.17 m
|-
|Olympic Games
|Rio de Janeiro, Brazil
|12th
|57.70 m
|-
|rowspan=3|2017
|European Throwing Cup
|Las Palmas, Spain
|bgcolor=cc9966|3rd
|59.00 m
|-
|World Championships
|London, England
|17th (q)
|60.86 m
|-
|Universiade
|Taipei, Taiwan
|5th
|60.59 m
|-
|rowspan=3|2018
|European Throwing Cup
|Leiria, Portugal
|bgcolor=silver|2nd
|60.02 m
|-
|European Championships
|Berlin, Germany
|bgcolor="gold"|1st
|67.90 m, CR
|-
|Continental Cup
|Ostrava, Czech Republic
|bgcolor=silver|2nd
|62.96 m
|-
|rowspan=2|2019
|European Throwing Cup
|Šamorín, Slovakia
|bgcolor=silver|2nd
|65.47 m
|-
|World Championships
|Doha, Qatar
|4th
|65.21 m
|-
|2021
|Olympic Games
|Tokyo, Japan
|9th
|59.94 m
|}

Seasonal bests by year

2009 – 49.93 m
2010 – 55.35 m
2011 – 59.74 m
2012 – 55.74 m
2013 – 58.55 m
2014 – 63.34 m
2015 – 65.92 m
2016 – 66.41 m
2017 – 64.18 m
2018 – 67.90 m
2019 – 66.59 m
2020 - 64.10 m
2021 - 69.19 m'''

References

External links
 
 
 
 
 
 

1994 births
Living people
People from Zweibrücken
Sportspeople from Rhineland-Palatinate
German female javelin throwers
Olympic female javelin throwers
Olympic athletes of Germany
Athletes (track and field) at the 2016 Summer Olympics
Athletes (track and field) at the 2020 Summer Olympics
Athletes (track and field) at the 2010 Summer Youth Olympics
World Athletics Championships athletes for Germany
World Youth Championships in Athletics winners
German national athletics champions
Diamond League winners